Sainte-Hélène may refer to:

Places

Canada
Sainte-Hélène, Quebec, a municipality in the Bas-Saint-Laurent region
Sainte-Hélène-de-Bagot, Quebec
Sainte-Hélène-de-Breakeyville, a community within the City of Lévis, Quebec
Sainte-Hélène-de-Mancebourg, Quebec
Île Sainte-Hélène (Saint Helen's Island), an island in the Saint Lawrence River, part of the city of Montreal, Quebec
Fort de l'Île Sainte-Hélène, a fort on Saint Helen's Island

France
Sainte-Hélène is the name or part of the name of several communes in France:

Sainte-Hélène, in the Gironde department
Sainte-Hélène, in the Lozère department
Sainte-Hélène, in the Morbihan department
Sainte-Hélène, in the Saône-et-Loire department
Sainte-Hélène, in the Vosges department
 Sainte-Hélène, former commune of the Seine-Maritime department, now part of Sainte-Hélène-Bondeville
Sainte-Hélène-Bondeville, in the Seine-Maritime department
Sainte-Hélène-du-Lac, in the Savoie department
Sainte-Hélène-sur-Isère, in the Savoie department

Other
Jacques le Moyne de Sainte-Hélène (1659–1690), Canadian soldier
Médaille de Sainte-Hélène, French commemorative medal to commemorate the campaigns of the soldiers under Napoleon I
Sainte-Helene (grape), another name for the French wine grape Canari noir

See also
Saint Helena (disambiguation)
Santa Helena (disambiguation)
St. Helen (disambiguation)
St Helens (disambiguation)